David Salesin is an American computer scientist. He has worked in computer graphics, three-dimensional and four-dimensional mathematics, and photorealistic rendering. Until 2019, he was the Director of Snap Inc. Research Team, an affiliate professor in the Department of Computer Science & Engineering of the University of Washington in Seattle, and previously director of the Adobe Creative Technologies Lab. He is currently a Principal Scientist at Google.

Salesin graduated from Brown University in 1983, and did graduate work at Stanford.

Salesin received a National Young Investigator award from the National Science Foundation in 1993, and in 1995 was named a Presidential Faculty Fellow, receiving a National Science Foundation grant.

Computer Animation Rendering
André and Wally B. (1984) models: André/Wally
Young Sherlock Holmes (1985) computer animation: Industrial Light & Magic
Luxo Jr. (1986) rendering
Tin Toy (1988) dynamics
Toy Story (1995) renderman software development

References

External links
 
 http://www.adobe.com/technology/people/san-francisco/david-salesin.html
 http://salesin.cs.washington.edu/cv.html

Year of birth missing (living people)
Living people
American computer scientists
Brown University alumni
University of Washington faculty